"Black Tattoo" is the first single by Australian rock band Grinspoon from their fifth studio album, Alibis & Other Lies. It was released on 30 June 2007 on the Grudge label (the Australian imprint of Universal Records), debuting at No. 45 on the ARIA Singles Chart. The song also polled at No. 72 on Triple J's Hottest 100 for 2007. The video shows the band being dragged along a prairie while one of the members drives the car that's dragging them.

Track listing

Charts

References

2007 singles
Grinspoon songs
2007 songs
Universal Records singles
Songs written by Phil Jamieson
Songs written by Pat Davern